"The Laboratory" is a poem and dramatic monologue by Robert Browning. The poem was first published in June 1844 in Hood's Magazine and Comic Miscellany, and later Dramatic Romances and Lyrics in 1845.

This poem, set in seventeenth-century France, is the monologue of a woman speaking to an apothecary as he prepares a poison, which she intends to use to kill her rivals in love. It was inspired by the life of Marie Madeleine Marguerite D'Aubray, marquise de Brinvilliers (1630-1676), who poisoned her father and two brothers and planned to poison her husband, matching the narrator's actions in 'The Laboratory'.

References

External links

1844 poems
Poetry by Robert Browning